The Jakarta-Surabaya line (the North line; Indonesian: Lintas Utara) is one of two rail lines on the island of Java that connect Jakarta and Surabaya. The line follows the route of the North Coast Road. The executive-class Argo Bromo Anggrek express train provides a limited-stop service on the line.

In September 2019, Indonesia signed a project agreement with Japan for the medium-speed train project to link Jakarta and Surabaya. The project, which will incorporate some existing tracks, is expected to double the current speed of the existing train to 160kph. It will slash travel time between the two cities from nine hours to five and a half hours. It is estimated that the project will cost IDR60tn (US$4.3bn), which will be funded by Japanese loans.

References

See also
Argo Bromo Anggrek
Jakarta–Manggarai line
PT Kereta Api

3 ft 6 in gauge railways in Indonesia
Railway lines in Indonesia